The Speedway Champions Cup was an annual motorcycle speedway event organized by the International Motorcycling Federation (FIM) between 1986 and 1993.

The 1988 event was held on August 14 in Krsko, Slovenia, then part of Yugoslavia. The winner was the Swedish rider Per Jonsson.

References

Speedway Champions Cup
Champions Cup
Speedway Champions Cup